Opisthorchiata is a suborder of flatworms in the subclass Digenea.

Families
Superfamily Opisthorchioidea Braun, 1901
Cryptogonimidae Ward, 1917
Heterophyidae Leiper, 1909
Opisthorchiidae Looss, 1899

References

Protostome suborders
Plagiorchiida